Odenthal is a municipality in the Rheinisch-Bergischer Kreis, in North Rhine-Westphalia, Germany.

Geography
Odenthal is situated approximately 5 km north of Bergisch Gladbach and 15 km north-east of Cologne.

Neighbouring places
Nearby cities are Leverkusen, Burscheid, Wermelskirchen, and Bergisch Gladbach. Neighboring municipalities include Kürten.

Division of the town
The municipality includes 32 districts (Ortsteile):

Altehufe - Altenberg - Blecher - Busch - Bülsberg - Bömberg - Bömerich - Eikamp - Erberich - Feld - Glöbusch - Grimberg - Großgrimberg - Hahnenberg - Holz - Höffe - Hüttchen - Klasmühle - Küchenberg - Kümps - Landwehr - Menrath - Neschen - Oberscheid - Osenau - Pistershausen - Schallemich - Scheuren - Schmeisig - Schwarzbroich - Selbach - Voiswinkel.

Twin towns
  Cernay la Ville (France), since 1996
  Paimio (Finland), since 2011

References

External links
  

 
Districts of the Rhine Province